Alex Szostak (born 4 April 1986) is a former Scotland international rugby league footballer who played as a  forward for the Sheffield Eagles in the RFL Championship and Workington Town in Kingstone Press League 1.

Background
Szostak was born in Keighley, West Yorkshire, England.

Career
Szostak started his career with Bradford Bulls, and played for several seasons in the club's under-21 team.

Alex won two Championship titles with Sheffield in 2012 and 2013, before leaving the club to concentrate on his work commitments. Szostak signed with Workington Town for the 2014 season but sustained a knee injury during a match against Whitehaven, which kept him out of the remaining games of the 2014 and start of the 2015 season.

In June 2015 Szostak signed again with Workington Town for the remaining games of the 2015 season. Szostak made his 2nd début for Workington Town against London Broncos on Sunday, 19 July, at Derwent Park.

References

External links
(archived by web.archive.org) Sheffield Eagles profile
 http://www.townrlfc.com/team_member.php?id=2560
 http://www.scotlandrl.com/

1986 births
Living people
British police officers
English rugby league players
English people of Polish descent
English people of Scottish descent
Rugby league players from Keighley
Rugby league second-rows
Scotland national rugby league team players
Sheffield Eagles players
Workington Town players